Gelechia pallidagriseella is a moth of the family Gelechiidae. It is found in North America, where it has been recorded from Texas.

Adults are pale yellowish grey, a little suffused with ochreous on the thorax and forewings. There is a minute rust red spot about the middle of the disc and the extreme costa is dark brown at the base.

References

Moths described in 1874
Gelechia